Tabernaemontana dichotoma, commonly known as Eve's apple, is a plant in the dogbane family Apocynaceae. The specific epithet refers to the species'  dichotomous branches.

Description
The trunk measures up  in diameter. The plant's latex, fruit and seeds are all poisonous.

Distribution and habitat
Tabernaemontana dichotoma is native to Sri Lanka.

References

dichotoma
Flora of Sri Lanka
Plants described in 1829
Poisonous plants